Inter-Con Security Systems, Inc. is a US-based multinational security services company headquartered in Pasadena, California that provides a full range of comprehensive security services. Inter-Con is one of the largest private security companies in the world with over 35,000 employees across North America, South America and Africa. The company offers security personnel and management, executive protection programs, risk assessments, tactical exercise plans and programs, emergency medical services, classified information safeguarding and investigations.

History
Inter-Con Security Systems, Inc. (Inter-Con) was founded in 1973 with the goal of developing and implementing comprehensive security programs custom tailored to its clients’ needs. Retired Los Angeles Police Department (LAPD) Detective Enrique “Hank” Hernandez and his wife Bertha Hernandez founded Inter-Con in Alhambra, California in 1973. Since 1986, his son, Enrique Hernandez, Jr., has been president and Chief Executive Officer. It remains a privately owned company.

The company's first customer was the U.S. National Aeronautics and Space Administration (NASA) to implement a security program incorporating a variety of security disciplines in a classified environment. This critically different starting place, and the sophisticated security efforts which followed, have shaped Inter-Con’s growth and organizational development.

Operations
Inter-Con's security services include physical security, program management, electronic security, security consulting and training, specialized services, active shooter response, and executive protection. The company's client list includes federal, state and local governments, multinational corporations, non-governmental organizations, public utilities, private businesses, hospitals, sports arenas, and high net worth individuals, among others. Internationally, Inter-Con has developed into the premier provider of diplomatic security services, safeguarding dozens of United States Embassies, as well as dozens of other embassy locations around the world.

Key sectors served by Inter-Con include aerospace & defense, consumer goods & services, education, energy & utilities, financial, government & diplomatic, healthcare, manufacturing, natural materials & resources, and non-governmental organizations.

References

External links
  Official website

Companies based in Los Angeles County, California
Business services companies established in 1973